According to Numbers 15:32-36, the gatherer (Hebrew מקשש, Mekosheish), or Wood-Gatherer (Hebrew מקושש עצים, Mekosheish Eitzim) was an anonymous Israelite who violated the Sabbath by gathering wood while the Israelites were in the desert, and was brought before Moses, Aaron, and the people for judgement. As the punishment was unknown for such a case, the man was first imprisoned; then, upon God's directive to Moses, he was stoned by the people outside the camp.

References

Book of Numbers people
Sabbath